Matina Kolokotronis (born November 21, 1964) is Chief Operating Officer of the Sacramento Kings of the National Basketball Association. Kolokotronis is in her 22nd season with the Kings.

Early life
Born in Chicago, Illinois, Kolokotronis is the second of four daughters born to Greek immigrants. Kolokotronis received her B.A. from Loyola University, Chicago, and her law degree from McGeorge Law School, University of the Pacific (United States).

Personal
Kolokotronis’s husband, Sotiris Kolokotronis, is a real estate developer in Sacramento. They have three children.

See also

References

Living people
People from Chicago
Sacramento Kings executives
1964 births
American people of Greek descent
Loyola University Chicago alumni
Women basketball executives